The 2012–13 New Hampshire Wildcats men's basketball team  represented the University of New Hampshire during the 2012–13 NCAA Division I men's basketball season. The Wildcats, led by eighth-year-head-coach Bill Herrion, played their home-games at Lundholm Gym and were members of the America East Conference. They finished the season 9–20, 5–11 in American East play to finish in a tie for sixth place. They lost in the quarterfinals of the American East tournament to Vermont.

Roster

Schedule

|-
!colspan=9| Regular season

|-
!colspan=9|2013 America East tournament

References

New Hampshire
New Hampshire Wildcats men's basketball seasons
Wild
Wild